"Julie Doe" is the nickname given to a transgender woman believed to have been murdered in Clermont, Florida, in 1988. Neither the victim's identity, nor the identity of those involved in her death, have been established. The victim was believed to be a cisgender woman until DNA testing in 2015.

Discovery
The mummified remains of the victim, aged between 22 and 35, were located at a roadside in the "Green Swamp" area of Clermont, Lake County, Florida on September 25, 1988. A man looking for lumber made the initial discovery. The body was dragged to a concealed area, off the roadway of County Road 474, not far from the border between Lake and Polk Counties.

She wore a bluish-green tank top and an acid-washed denim skirt. The pantyhose she wore had been partially removed, suggesting  that sexual assault may have taken place. No shoes, jewelry, or other personal items were found at the scene, including forms of identification. Investigators suspect murder because of the suspicious circumstances surrounding the placement of her body.

Based on the condition of the body, it was estimated that she had died about two weeks to eight months before the discovery. The remains were not in recognizable condition.

Examination
The morning after the remains were discovered, the remains were autopsied  at the C.A. Pound Human Identification Laboratory in Gainesville, Florida, by William R. Maples. The cause of death was not apparent.

The victim's hair was described as long and bleached a strawberry-blond color. She had long, manicured fingernails, which may have been artificial. Healed fractures were identified on her toes, one of her cheekbones, a rib, and possibly her nose. She was between 5'9" and 5'11, weighing between 150 and 180 pounds. She had also undergone cosmetic surgeries. She had 250cc silicone breast implants, which would appear proportional to the victim's body. The procedure may have been performed in Atlanta, Georgia; Miami, Florida; New Orleans, Louisiana; New York City or California. It is believed the sex reassignment surgery occurred around 1984, based on the fact that the implants were discontinued around 1983. She apparently had a rhinoplasty, which may have been related to the injury she sustained to her nose. It was initially thought she had given birth at least once, based on evidence of pitting on the pelvis, attributed to hormonal changes.

The victim was initially believed to be a cisgender woman until a 2015 DNA test found XY chromosomes, showing that she was male at birth and had transitioned or was in the process of transitioning, based on the cosmetic surgeries she had undergone. Additionally, she was taking hormone replacement medication, which caused changes to the pelvic bones, leading to the previous assumption she had a history of pregnancy.

Investigation
Shortly after the remains were discovered, fingerprints were taken in hopes to identify the victim. An initial sketch was created to depict an approximation of her appearance in life. After the discovery that Julie Doe was a transgender woman, the sheriff's department commissioned a new forensic sketch to be created from the skull; retired Detective and forensic artist Stephen Fusco created the image. This is also the time when she received her nickname. Students examining the remains selected the name "Julie" from the LGBT-themed film To Wong Foo, Thanks For Everything! Julie Newmar.

In July 2018, isotopic tests were performed in Tampa, Florida by the University of South Florida on samples from the decedent's skull, to pinpoint potential locations where she resided. The results suggested the victim originated from southern Florida. A sergeant working on the case voiced the possibility that the victim underwent challenges related to being a transgender woman during the 1980s. Others have elaborated that family estrangement or disownment may have played a role in her status as unidentified. As no missing individuals from this region matched her description, her disappearance was likely unreported.

Investigators sought services from the DNA Doe Project, which specializes in identifying potential family members of unknown individuals through genetic genealogy. Two attempts, funded by the investigating agency, to extract enough DNA from the bones proved unsuccessful. The organization later began fundraising for a third attempt in November 2018, which also failed to generate a usable file. In January 2020, a suitable sample was successfully obtained for genealogical research after a fourth lab was consulted.

DNA Doe Project volunteers Lee and Anthony Redgrave founded The Trans Doe Task Force to advocate for unidentified victims who were transgender or gender non-conforming. The pair voiced concern that genetic genealogy research may reveal a decedent's birth and/or legal name, but may not provide what title the individual preferred during life. One of the task force's goals is to research, following an identification, how the subject identified to prevent deadnaming.

See also
List of unsolved murders

References

External links

Julie Doe at the DNA Doe Project

1960s births
1950s births
1988 deaths
1988 murders in the United States
20th-century women
Date of birth unknown
Deaths by person in Florida
Female murder victims
LGBT history in Florida
LGBT people from Florida
People from Clermont, Florida
Sexual assaults in the United States
Unidentified murder victims in Florida
Unsolved murders in the United States
Violence against trans women
Transgender women
20th-century American LGBT people
1988 in LGBT history
1988 in Florida